Fred Rathbone (3 August 1885 – 1959) was an English footballer who played in the Football League for Stoke.

Career
Rathbone joined Stoke on his 21st birthday and made his debut against Sheffield Wednesday where he managed to keep a clean sheet. However first team opportunities were rare for Rathbone his only run in the side came when the club was playing in the Birmingham League.

Career statistics

References

1885 births
1959 deaths
Footballers from Stoke-on-Trent
English footballers
Association football goalkeepers
Stoke City F.C. players
Whitchurch F.C. players
Winsford United F.C. players
English Football League players